Yooreeka is a library for data mining, machine learning, soft computing, and mathematical analysis. The project started with the code of the book "Algorithms of the Intelligent Web". Although the term "Web" prevailed in the title, in essence, the algorithms are valuable in any software application.

It covers all major algorithms and provides many examples.

Yooreeka 2.x is licensed under the Apache License rather than the somewhat more restrictive LGPL (which was the license of v1.x).

The library is written 100% in the Java language.

Algorithms
The following algorithms are covered:
 Clustering
 Hierarchical—Agglomerative (e.g. MST single link; ROCK) and Divisive
 Partitional (e.g. k-means)
 Classification
 Bayesian
 Decision trees
 Neural Networks
 Rule based (via Drools)
 Recommendations
 Collaborative filtering
 Content based
 Search
 PageRank
 DocRank
 Personalization

References

External links
Baynoo Website
Yooreeka on GitHub
Yooreeka on Google Code (old repository)

Data mining and machine learning software
Free science software
Java (programming language) software
Free data analysis software